Miroslav "Mika" Antić (14 March 1932 – 24 June 1986) was a Serbian poet, film director, journalist and painter. He was a major figure of the Yugoslav Black Wave. He had six children.

Biography
He wrote poems, articles, dramas, movie and TV scripts and documentaries. As a film-maker, he was considered as a part of the "Black Wave" of Yugoslav film. His films, in particular Breakfast with the devil in which Antić criticized the double morality of the communists during Tito’s time, were forbidden and destroyed. They were rediscovered and restored in the end of the 1990s. He acted in several movies and was a painter.

In addition to poems about Romani people with whom he identified (despite being of Serbian ancestry), because of his bohemian lifestyle, and the long poem on Vojvodina published as a separate book, he is especially well known for much recited at poetry gatherings and competitions poems about teenagers Plavi čuperak (A Blond Lock of Hair).

His oldest son, Igor, is a visual artist.

Works 
 Vojvodina
 Ispričano za proleće, 1951
 Roždestvo tvoje
 Plavo nemo
 Nasmejani svet, 1955
 Psovke nežnosti
 Koncert za 1001 bubanj, 1962
 Mit o ptici
 Šašava knjiga, 1972
 Izdajstvo lirike
 Plavi čuperak, 1965
 Na slovo, na slovo, 1965
 Horoskop, 1983
 Prva ljubav, 1978
 Garavi sokak, 1973
 Živeli prekosutra, 1974
 Na slovo, na slovo, 1975
 Plava zvezda
 Na slovo, na slovo, 2010

References

External links
 Translated works by Miroslav "Mika Antić"
 Miroslav Antic-pesme za decu

1932 births
1986 deaths
Writers from Kikinda
Serbian journalists
Serbian male poets
Golden Arena winners
20th-century Serbian poets
Serbian film directors
Serbian painters
Serbian editors
Serbian screenwriters
Male screenwriters
Serbian children's writers
20th-century screenwriters
20th-century journalists